Dana Gaier is an American actress who voiced Edith in the Despicable Me franchise.

Gaier was raised in Livingston, New Jersey. She got into acting after accompanying her older sister to an audition after her mother couldn't find a babysitter and brought her along. Gaier moved to Burbank, California around 2013 and has been a student at the University of California, Los Angeles.

Filmography
 Despicable Me (2010) - Edith (voice)
 Despicable Me Minion Mayhem (2012) - Edith (voice)
 Despicable Me 2 (2013) - Edith (voice)
 Despicable Me 3 (2017) - Edith (voice)
 The Ice Cream Truck (2017) - Brie
Ernesto's Manifesto (2019)

References

External links

Actresses from New Jersey
American child actresses
American film actresses
American voice actresses
Living people
People from Burbank, California
People from Livingston, New Jersey
University of California, Los Angeles alumni
21st-century American women
Year of birth missing (living people)